Woodstock Union High School (WUHS) is a mid-sized public secondary school located in Woodstock, Vermont, United States. As a member of the Windsor Central Unified Union School District, the school serves seven towns: Barnard, Bridgewater, Killington, Plymouth, Pomfret, Reading, and Woodstock. In addition, WUHS receives tuition students from other surrounding towns such as Hartland, Ludlow, Pittsfield, Sharon, Stockbridge, and Weathersfield, among others. The institution is accredited by the New England Association of Schools and Colleges. Woodstock serves approximately 385 High School students and 190 Middle School students.

School history and overview 
Woodstock's first public high school opened January 16, 1854. This opening was less than a year after the town, at its annual meeting, had voted to build the school. The land, purchased in April 1853, was on a knoll below Linden Hill. The school is consistently recognized for its educational quality and in 2020 was listed by U.S. News & World Report as the third best school in the state.

Academic programs 
The high school has 10 academic departments including Mathematics, Modern & Classical Languages, Computer Science, and Music. There are Advanced Placement classes in chemistry, English, government & politics, and languages. In 2018 the school opened a new Innovation Studio dedicated to "navigating the messiness of the creative process, from inception to completion," according to the 2018-2019 curriculum guide. In the studio in the fall of 2018, students partnered with peers in Turkey to design a playground. Teachers at Woodstock partner with staff at NuVu Innovation School in Cambridge, Mass., to operate the studio.

Sports and clubs 
The school athletic programs fall into the Vermont Principals' Association Division II and Division III for all sports with the exception of Division I boys lacrosse. Woodstock athletics include: cross country, field hockey, football, golf, boys soccer, girls soccer, alpine skiing, boys basketball, boys ice hockey, girls ice hockey, nordic skiing, snowboard, baseball, boys lacrosse, girls lacrosse, softball, boys tennis, girls tennis, and track and field. Mountain biking competes in the Vermont Youth Cycling series, and were champions in 2022.

The 2018 varsity football team won the Division III Vermont state championship and finished the season undefeated. The 2018 and 2019 varsity boys hockey teams won two consecutive Division II Vermont state championships. The 2022 varsity girls hockey team won the Division II Vermont state championship, the first in the program's history, and then repeated as state champions in 2023. 

WUHS clubs include: YoH Theater Players, Scholar's Bowl, Math Team, Future Farmers of America, and Medical Club.

Notable alumni 
Victor Ambros, discoverer of miRNA, winner of many international awards, including Lasker Award, Breakthrough Prize, Gairdner Foundation International Award, Keio Medical Science Prize, Wolf Prize in Medicine
Keegan Bradley (born June 7, 1986) is an American professional golfer who is a rookie on the PGA Tour and has won two tour events, most notably the 2011 PGA Championship. He attended Woodstock Union High School through his junior year.
John C. Sherburne (1900).  Vermont's first Rhodes Scholar and Chief Justice of the Vermont Supreme Court.
Miro Weinberger, 42nd mayor of Burlington, Vermont
Daphne Zuniga, Graduated from WUHS In 1980. After graduating she became a Theater Arts major at the University of California. She acted in Melrose Place, as Victoria Davis on The CW teen drama, One Tree Hill, as Princess Vespa in Spaceballs and opposite John Cusack in "The Sure Thing"

References

Sources
Woodstock Uhsd #4. National Center for Education Statistics. Retrieved on 2011-11-30.
Wendling, Kathy (1989). "From One Room School to Union High School: The History of Windsor Central Supervisory Union".

External links 
Woodstock Union High School and Middle School

1854 establishments in Vermont
Educational institutions established in 1854
Public high schools in Vermont
Schools in Windsor County, Vermont
Buildings and structures in Woodstock, Vermont